Barnet is a settlement in British Columbia. It is part of Port Moody, British Columbia.

References

Settlements in British Columbia